Cristea is a common family name in Romania. Persons named Cristea include:

Adrian Cristea, Romanian footballer
Alexandru Cristea, Romanian composer
Andreea Cristea, Romanian killed in the 2017 Westminster attack in London
Andrei Cristea, Romanian footballer
Călin Cristea, Romanian footballer
Cătălina Cristea, Romanian tennis player
Ludmila Cristea, Moldovan wrestler
Miron Cristea, first Patriarch of the Romanian Orthodox Church
Nicolae Cristea, one of two individuals
Olga Cristea, Moldovan runner
P. G. Cristea, Romanian racing driver

See also 
 Cristian (disambiguation)
 Cristești (disambiguation)
 Cristescu (surname)

Romanian-language surnames